Zielone may refer to the following places in Poland:
Zielone, Lower Silesian Voivodeship (south-west Poland)
Zielone, Podlaskie Voivodeship (north-east Poland)
Zielone, Łódź Voivodeship (central Poland)
Zielone, Lublin Voivodeship (east Poland)
Zielone, Warmian-Masurian Voivodeship (north Poland)